Head Lake may refer to:

Canada
the community of Head Lake, Ontario
 Head Lake (Kawartha Lakes) in the Kawartha Lakes, Ontario
 Head Lake (Haliburton County) in Haliburton County, Ontario

United States
 Head Lake (Michigan)
 Head of the Lake (since 1979), annual rowing regatta held on Lake Washington